My Wife Is Being Stupid or My Wife Is Acting Silly is a 1952 West German comedy film directed by Géza von Bolváry and starring Inge Egger, Hans Holt, and Marina Ried. It was made at the Göttingen Studios. The film's sets were designed by the art directors Mathias Matthies and Ellen Schmidt.

Plot
A female journalist marries a chemist and settles down to become a housewife. However, when she decided to resume her old job he becomes suspicious of her activities.

Cast
Inge Egger as Dixi
Hans Holt as Dr. Robert Bruhn
Marina Ried as Elli
Georg Thomalla as Conny Weber
Oskar Sima as editor-in-chief Zeller
Rudolf Platte as Schänzle
Carla Noltens
Axel Ivers as Holgersen
Fritz Eberth
Ethel Reschke
Vico Torriani

References

External links

1952 comedy films
German comedy films
West German films
Films directed by Géza von Bolváry
Films about journalists
Constantin Film films
German black-and-white films
1950s German films
Films shot at Göttingen Studios
1950s German-language films